Wugang is a county-level city in Hunan Province, China. It is under the administration of Shaoyang prefecture-level city. Located on the southwest of the province and middle of Shaoyang's jurisdiction, the city is bordered to the north by Dongkou and Longhui Counties, to the west by Suining County, to the southwest by Chengbu County, to the southeast by Xinning County, to the northeast by Shaoyang County. The city has four subdistricts, 11 towns and three townships under its jurisdiction, the government seat is Shuiximen Subdistrict.

Administrative divisions

4 subdistricts
 Faxiangyan
 Shuiximen
 Yingchunting
 Yuanmenkou

11 towns
 Choushutang
 Dadian
 Dengjiapu
 Dengyuantai
 Jingzhupu
 Longxi
 Qinqiao
 Shuangpai
 Simachong
 Wantouqiao
 Wenping

3 township
 Maping
 Shuijinping
 Yantian

Language

The Wugang dialect belongs to Xiang Chinese language. The minority languages of Miao people and Yao people are also spoken.

Ethnic groups
Wugang is mostly populated by Xiang-speaking people which is a branch of Han-Chinese.
 
There are also Miao minority and Yao minority living in Wugang. One branch of the Wugang Yao people is known as "Dang".

Demographics
Wugang has a population of approximately 730,000.

Climate

References

 
County-level divisions of Hunan
Cities in Hunan
Shaoyang